Ilmari Vartia (25 August 1914 – 25 May 1951) was a Finnish fencer. He competed in the individual and team épée events at the 1948 Summer Olympics. He died as a result of a wound sustained during a competition in 1951.

References

1914 births
1951 deaths
Sportspeople from Jyväskylä
People from Vaasa Province (Grand Duchy of Finland)
Finnish male épée fencers
Olympic fencers of Finland
Fencers at the 1948 Summer Olympics
Sport deaths in Sweden